Dr Patel Mahendrabhai Somabhaiis is an Indian politician from Gujarat. He is a member of the BJP.

In 1998, he was elected from Aravalli district's Bayad assembly constituency of Gujarat.

He is MS ( General surgeon)  from BJ Medical College, Ahmedabad.

He is practicing as a general surgeon in Bayad.

He owns Gayatri Surgical hospital.

Family Members :

Meenaben M. Patel

Vashishttha, Hetvi

References

Living people
Bharatiya Janata Party politicians from Gujarat
Gujarat MLAs 1998–2002
People from Aravalli district
Year of birth missing (living people)